Harry Kramer may refer to:

 Harry Kramer (announcer) (1911–1996), American radio and television announcer
 Harry Kramer (American artist) (born 1939), American painter
 Harry Kramer (German artist) (1925–1997), German sculptor, choreographer, dancer, and professor of art